The 2020–21 Ethiopian Higher League is the second-tier football in Ethiopia. The competition is split into 3 different stages and will be contested by 33 clubs. In Stage 1 Group A's games will take place in Hawassa starting January 5, 2021, while Group B and Group C will take place in Batu & Dire Dawa respectively starting January 2, 2021. In stage 2 the games will be contested in Hawassa (Group A), Woldiya (Group B), Nekemte (Group C).

League table 
As of 10 March 2021

2020-21 Ethiopian Higher League Group A

2020-21 Ethiopian Higher League Group B

2020-21 Ethiopian Higher League Group C

Promoted clubs' stadiums

References 

Football in Ethiopia